Francisco José Antequera Alabau (born 9 March 1964) was a Spanish racing cyclist. He competed in the individual road race event at the 1984 Summer Olympics. Professional from 1985 to 1993, he won the Vuelta a La Rioja and the Tour de Burgos. He was selector of the Spanish men's road racing team from 1997 to 2008.

Major results
1984
  Spanish amateur road racing championships
1985
  stage of the Vuelta a La Rioja
 Vuelta a La Rioja
1986
  in the Vuelta a La Rioja
1987
  in the Vuelta a Cantabria
  in the Vuelta a Burgos
1989
  stage of the Vuelta a Burgos
 Tour de Burgos
  in the Clásica a los Puertos
  in the Clásica de San Sebastián
1990
  stage of the Vuelta a Cantabria

Results in the grand tours

Tour de France 
 1986 : 
 1987 : 
 1988 : 
 1989 : 
 1992 :

Vuelta a España 
 1986 : 
 1988 :

References

External links 
 

1964 births
Living people
Sportspeople from Valencia
Cyclists from the Valencian Community
Cyclists at the 1984 Summer Olympics
Olympic cyclists of Spain
Spanish male cyclists